Marmoricola korecus is a Gram-positive, aerobic and non-motile  bacterium from the genus Marmoricola which has been isolated from volcanic ash from Jeju, Korea.

References

External links 
Type strain of Marmoricola korecus at BacDive -  the Bacterial Diversity Metadatabase

Propionibacteriales
Bacteria described in 2011